Adam James Scholefield (born 24 May 1985 in Leeds, West Yorkshire)  is a researcher and British water polo player.

He graduated from Imperial College London with a degree in electrical engineering and a Ph.D in image processing. He is coached by Cristian Iordache, Petik Attila and Norman Leighton.

Scholefield competed for Great Britain at the 2012 Summer Olympics in London in the men's tournament at the Water Polo Arena. It was the first time the Great Britain men's national water polo team appeared at an Olympics since the 1956 Games held in Melbourne, Australia. In 2014, he won a gold medal at the Commonwealth Water Polo Championships in Aberdeen.

Since June 2015, and as of March 2017, Scholefield is working, with Prof. Martin Vetterli, as a postdoctoral researcher at the École Polytechnique Fédérale de Lausanne.

References

External links
 

1985 births
English male water polo players
Living people
Sportspeople from Leeds
Water polo players at the 2012 Summer Olympics
Olympic water polo players of Great Britain